First-seeded Rod Laver defeated Roy Emerson 3–6, 2–6, 6–3, 9–7, 6–2 in the final to win the men's singles tennis title at the 1962 French Championships.

Seeds
The seeded players are listed below. Rod Laver is the champion; others show the round in which they were eliminated.

  Rod Laver (champion)
  Roy Emerson (final)
  Manuel Santana (semifinals)
  Nicola Pietrangeli (quarterfinals)
  Neale Fraser (semifinals)
  Whitney Reed (third round)
  Boro Jovanović (fourth round)
  Warren Jacques (second round)
  Jan-Erik Lundqvist (third round)
  Ramanathan Krishnan (quarterfinals)
  Pierre Darmon (quarterfinals)
  Michael Sangster (second round)
  Ingo Buding (second round)
  Billy Knight (fourth round)
  Wilhelm Bungert (fourth round)
  Gordon Forbes (second round)

Draw

Key
 Q = Qualifier
 WC = Wild card
 LL = Lucky loser
 r = Retired

Finals

Earlier rounds

Section 1

Section 2

Section 3

Section 4

Section 5

Section 6

Section 7

Section 8

External links
   on the French Open website

1962
1962 in French tennis